is a former Japanese baseball player from Yasu, Shiga Prefecture.

Biography

Early years
Kodai Sakurai started baseball in his 3rd year in an elementary school.  He entered PL Gakuen High School in 1999 and played in the 82nd Japanese High School Baseball Championship in his second year at the high school.  He was drafted by the Tigers in 2001.

Nippon Professional Baseball
He played only in the Western League for 5 years because Norihiro Akahoshi, Tomoaki Kanemoto, Osamu Hamanaka, Shinjiro Hiyama and other outfielders played in the Central League.  He got the batting average of .350 in 2005 and .291 in 2006.

His first appearance in the Central League (professional debut) was on May 18, 2007.  He got over 10 home runs per season for the first time in 2009 season.

References

Baseball Reference

1983 births
Living people
Baseball people from Shiga Prefecture
Japanese baseball players
Nippon Professional Baseball outfielders
Hanshin Tigers players